Cape Goudouras, anciently known as Erythraeum promontorium, is a headland at the southeast of Crete. Anciently, nearby was the ancient town of Erythraea.

References

Headlands of Greece
Geography of Crete